Ombadja (known as Santa Clara until 1975) is municipality in Cunene Province, Angola. Its seat is the village of Xangongo (known in ancient times as Roçadas). It occupies 12,264 square kilometers and has about 304,964 inhabitants . It is bordered to the north by the municipality of Matala, in the east by the municipalities of Cuvelai, Namacunde, Cuanhama, west by the municipalities of Curoca and Cahama. It contains the communes of Xangongo, Ombala-Yo-Mungo, Naulila, Humbe and Mucope.

References

Cunene Province
Municipalities of Angola